Alberto Machimbarrena Aguirrebengoa (31 March 1888 – 19 July 1923) was a Spanish footballer who played as a midfielder.

Biography

During his career he alternated between two clubs: hometown team Real Sociedad and Real Madrid, known at the time as Madrid FC. While he played for Real Madrid, he was also studying architecture in the Spanish capital.

He became the leader of Real Madrid, captaining the team which won the Copa del Rey in 1917. He played for Real Madrid in eight official matches, all of them in the Copa del Rey, without scoring. For Real Sociedad he played 30 official matches between 1910 and 1922.

After retirement, in 1922, he returned to play some matches for Real Sociedad, which was in need of footballers.

He died prematurely in 1923 in Guadarrama (Madrid), because of tuberculosis.

In 1925, a statue of Machimbarrena and Sotero Aranguren (a Real Madrid teammate, who also died prematurely) was erected at the entrance of the team's dressing room at the Santiago Bernabéu Stadium.

Honours
Real Madrid
Copa del Rey: 1917
Campeonato Regional Centro: 1915–16, 1916–17

References

External links 
 Machimbarrena's biography at Real Madrid official website (Spanish)

1888 births
1923 deaths
Spanish footballers
Association football midfielders
Real Sociedad footballers
Real Madrid CF players
20th-century deaths from tuberculosis
Footballers from San Sebastián
Tuberculosis deaths in Spain